The murder of Krista Lea Harrison occurred on July 17, 1982, in Marshallville, Ohio. The case remained unsolved for two years, until Robert Anthony Buell was convicted of her murder in 1984. In the year 2000, Harrison's case appeared on the fifth season of the American television show Forensic Files in an episode titled "Material Evidence."

Abduction and murder 

Eleven-year-old Krista Harrison had been picking up aluminum cans in the Marshallville park with one of her friends. It was reported by her friend that a man between 25 and 35 with shoulder-length hair drove up to Harrison in his van and forced her into the vehicle and drove away. Harrison's companion described the abductor's van to have been a brown or dark red color that had round windows on the sides, near the rear. After she was kidnapped, volunteers searched for her body across Marshallville to no avail. It was initially believed that the man would demand ransom for Krista's return, yet no contact was made.

It was not until six days later that her remains, which were in an advanced stage of decomposition, were discovered in the weeds, a few feet off the side of a scarcely traveled road in adjacent Holmes County, Ohio. She had been strangled and sexually assaulted with a vibrator and a large plastic bag had been wrapped around her legs. Because of the condition of her remains, police were not able to identify the body until Harrison's father Gerald confirmed that it was his daughter. A Budweiser towel, a bloody car seat box, a wad of Harrison's hair, gloves, a plaid shirt and jeans were all found in the vicinity of the dump site. Examination of the remains indicated that the body was subjected to high temperatures, which was likely a consequence of her body remaining inside of the vehicle for a long period of time during summer weather. Harrison was buried in the Maple Grove Cemetery in Marshallville.

Investigation
Nutmeg or orange-colored polyester fibers were found on Harrison’s body and the towel near the scene. After they were examined under a microscope, investigators concluded that they were of trilobal shape and were likely from some type of carpet. Similar fibers were found on the body of Tina Harmon, a 12-year-old girl who was raped and murdered eight months earlier. A man had already been convicted on circumstantial evidence in her death and was incarcerated when Harrison was abducted. Authorities then began to consider that both girls were victims of the same person, as they were both sexually violated, strangled, and killed in the same county. The two also had the same sort of fibers on their remains, further linking the crimes.

The bag found wrapped around the lower half of Harrison's body was unique, as it had distinct folding patterns and thickness that occurred during the manufacturing process. The bag was traced to a factory in Pioneer, Ohio. Such bags were used for packaging a type of car seat, which was black in color. These seats, sold through Sears, were only available for a brief amount of time through mailing. The box containing Harrison's blood belonged to the same type of car seat. Sales records of the seats were subsequently examined from the store, to search for any Ohio resident who might have purchased the seats. Twenty-three people in northern Ohio had purchased this type of car seat, but none owned a van that matched the one used during the abduction.

Capture and trial of Robert Buell 

After Harrison's body was found, a $10,000 reward was placed for information about the abductor, which showed composite sketches of the perpetrator. No one was arrested until a year later. In 1983, 43-year-old Robert Anthony Buell, employed by the state of Ohio, kidnapped a 28-year-old woman while she was working as a manager at an Ohio gas station in Damascus, Ohio. The woman's head was shaved, she was shocked with a severed electrical cord, beaten and was bound to Buell's bed and raped. She was able to escape, twelve hours later, fearing for her life, and ran to a nearby house and notified police after her attacker had left to go to work. Such a man had previously preyed on Ohio women, who were usually in their late twenties to forties.

Police then compared the orange carpet fibers found on Harrison's body to the ones in Buell's van, which was the same color as the one seen in 1982. The rear-view windows were of a different shape, although it was later revealed that they had been replaced. It was later concluded that the fibers on Harrison's body and the carpet in the van were a likely match and records from Sears indicated that Buell had purchased the same type of car seat that was once contained in the bag and box used to conceal the body. Paint found on the jeans near the dump site matched that on the outside of Buell's residence as well. The jeans themselves were similar to other pairs that he owned. Spray paint in his garage was also matched to some that was present on the box. A fingerprint on plastic concealing Harrison's body did not match Buell’s fingerprints.

Buell pleaded no contest to the abduction and rape of the adult victim, yet he denied any involvement with Krista's murder. He was found guilty after being tried and sentenced to death in 1984; he was executed by lethal injection in 2002. He denied involvement and was never charged with the death of Tina Harmon, although dog hairs belonging to the remains of one found buried at his residence matched.
In 2010, DNA from the crime scene of Tina's murder was compared to Buell's and found to be a match, therefore indicating that he was involved in her rape and most likely, her murder. Another victim who was murdered in 1983, Deborah Kaye Smith, 10, had wax on her body that was from the same kind of candles that Buell owned. Her body was found over a month after her death, abandoned at the side of the Tuscarawas River.

Former journalist for the Cleveland Scene magazine, James Renner, has written through several of his works that Buell's nephew, Ralph Ross Jr., may have played a role in the murders, if not having been fully responsible. He has also connected the cases to that of the unsolved murders of 13-year-old Barbara Barnes and 10-year-old Amy Mihaljevic. Similar fibers on the latter victim's body were found.

See also
List of solved missing person cases

References

External links
 

1982 in Ohio
1982 murders in the United States
1984 in Ohio
July 1982 events in the United States
July 1982 crimes
Formerly missing people
Deaths by person in Ohio
Deaths by strangulation in the United States
Incidents of violence against girls
Murdered American children
Kidnappings in the United States
Missing person cases in Ohio
Murder in Ohio
Sexual assaults in the United States
Female murder victims
Wayne County, Ohio